"Too Hood" is a song by American recording artist Monica. It was written by Monica along with Bryan Michael Cox, Harold Lilly, and Jermaine Dupri for the singer's original third studio album All Eyez on Me (2002), featuring production by the latter and additional production by Cox. The song was released as a promotional single only in the United States during the third quarter of 2002. It reached minor success with a peak position of number 11 on the official US Bubbling Under R&B/Hip-Hop Singles.

In September 2002, the single following the mediocre chart success of the album's title song "All Eyez on Me." Unlike its predecessor, however, the track saw minimal success on the charts, and thus a music video was never produced. The lukewarm response to both singles eventually resulted in the reconstruction of the same-titled album, which received a Japan-wide release only and was subsequently retooled into a new version. Branded After the Storm (2003), "Too Hood" was later included on a limited bonus disc on the re-worked album. The track is also featured on the EA Sports's video game NBA Live 2003.

Background 
"Too Hood" was written by Monica, Bryan Michael Cox, Harold Lilly, and Jermaine Dupri, while production was overseen by the latter. Cox is credited as co-producer on the track. Monica has described the song as "a lighthearted way of explaining where I’m from. I really like that song."

Track listing 
All tracks written by Monica Arnold, Bryan Michael Cox, Jermaine Dupri, and Harold Lilly, and produced by Dupri, with co-production by Cox.

Credits and personnel
Credits lifted from the liner notes of All Eyez on Me.
 
 
 Monica Arnold – lead vocals, writer
 Bryan Michael Cox – co-producer, writer
 Tony Dawsey – mastering
 Jermaine Dupri – mixing, producer, vocals, writer
 
  Brian Frye – recording
 Harold Lilly – writer
 Phil Tan – mixing

Charts

References 

Monica (singer) songs
2002 singles
Song recordings produced by Jermaine Dupri
Songs written by Jermaine Dupri
Songs written by Bryan-Michael Cox
Songs written by Harold Lilly (songwriter)
2002 songs
Songs written by Monica (singer)
J Records singles